The Rider may refer to:

 The Rider (novel), a 1918 novel by Edgar Rice Burroughs
 The Rider (film), a 2017 American western drama film